Salduro (also Salduro Siding) is a ghost town located in Tooele County, Utah, United States.

Description
The name "Salduro" is a combination of Spanish words sal and duro and means "hard salt".

The settlement was located on the geologically-significant Salduro Salt Marsh, also known as the Bonneville Salt Flats.

History

Salduro formed next to the Western Pacific Railroad, which was completed in the early 1900s.  Significant salt beds were identified during the construction of the railroad, and several mining claims soon followed.  After several years of unprofitable attempts to produce salt, the claims were leased by the Capell Salt Company, which erected a small mill near Salduro.

Circa 1916, the Capell Salt Company merged into (or was transferred to) the Solvay Process Company, a potash producer.  That same year, the Solvay Process Company began extracting potash from subsurface brines of the Salduro Salt Marsh. The operation was constructed on the south side of the Western Pacific Railroad at Salduro station.

On June 23, 1924, U.S. Army test pilot Russell Maughan performed the first dawn-to-dusk transcontinental flight across the United States, flying a Curtiss P-1 Hawk. One of his five refueling stops was in Salduro.

The settlement gained prominence in the 1930s and 1940s, when significant potash and salt were mined nearby.

Decline
In 1944, the potash plant at Salduro closed.  Shortly after, fire swept through the settlement, and it was soon abandoned.

See also

 List of ghost towns in Utah

References

External links

Ghost towns in Tooele County, Utah
Ghost towns in Utah
Great Salt Lake Desert